Agrilinae is a subfamily of beetles in the family Buprestidae, containing the following genera:

 Aaaaba Bellamy, 2013
 Afrocylindromorphus Bily & Bellamy, 1998
 Agrilochyseus Thery, 1935
 Agrilodia Obenberger, 1923
 Agriloides Kerremans, 1903
 Agrilus Curtis, 1825
 Alissoderus Deyrolle, 1864
 Amorphosoma Laporte, 1835
 Amorphosternoides Cobos, 1974
 Amorphosternus Deyrolle, 1864
 Amyia Saunders, 1871
 Anadora Kerremans, 1898
 Anaphlocteis Bellamy, 1986
 Angatra Descarpentries, 1969
 Anocisseis Bellamy, 1990
 Anodontodora Obenberger, 1931
 Antanambia Descarpentries, 1975
 Anthaxomorphus Deyrolle, 1864
 Aphanisticus Latreille, 1829
 Asymades Kerremans, 1893
 Australodraco Curletti, 2006
 Autarcontes Waterhouse, 1887
 Belgaumia Kerremans, 1903
 Bellamyus Curletti, 1997
 Bergidora Kerremans, 1903
 Borneoscelus Bellamy, 1995
 Brachycoraebus Kerremans, 1903
 Brachydora Obenberger, 1923
 Brachys Dejean, 1833
 Bourgoinia Obenberger, 1926
 Callimicra Deyrolle, 1864
 Callipyndax Waterhouse, 1887
 Camerunadora Bellamy, 2008
 Cantoniellus Kalashian, 2004
 Cantonius Thery, 1929
 Capitijubatus Bellamy, 1986
 Chalcophlocteis Obenberger, 1924
 Chloricala Kerremans, 1893
 Cisseicoraebus Obenberger, 1923 - this genus was originally named and described by Kerremans in his 1903 monograph
 Clema Semenov-Tian-Shianskij, 1900
 Cobosietta Bellamy, 1986
 Compsoglypha Fairmaire, 1904
 Coraebastus Fairmaire, 1896
 Coraebina Obenberger, 1923 - correct spelling is Coroebina
 Coraebosoma Obenberger, 1923
 Coraebus Gory & Laporte, 1839
 Cryptodactylus Deyrolle, 1864
 Cryptomorpha Bellamy, 1988
 Cupriscobina Bellamy & Holm, 1985
 Cylindromorphoides Kerremans, 1903
 Cylindromorphus Kiesenwetter, 1857
 Cyphothroax Waterhouse, 1887
 Dejongiella Bellamy, 2006 - the correct date is 2003
 Demostis Kerremans, 1900
 Dessumia Descarpentries & Villiers, 1966
 Deyrollius Obenbgerger, 1922
 Diadora Kerremans, 1903
 Diadorina Cobos, 1974
 Dinocephalia Obenberger, 1923
 Dinocoroebus Obenberger, 1924
 Diphucrania Dejean, 1833
 Discoderella Bellamy, 1988
 Discoderes Chevrolat, 1838
 Discoderoides Thery, 1936
 Discoderopsis Thery, 1930
 Dismorpha Gistel, 1848
 Dorochoviella Jendek, 2006
 Duncanius Bellamy, 2008
 Endelomorphus Bily, 2007
 Endelus Deyrolle, 1864
 Entomogaster Saunders, 1871
 Epimacha Kerremans, 1900
 Ethiopoeus Bellamy, 2008
 Ethonion Kuban, 2001 - the correct date is 2000
 Euamyia Kerremans, 1903
 Euchroaria Obenberger, 1924
 Eudiadora Obenberger, 1924
 Eulasiodora Obenberger, 1924
 Eumerophilus Deyrolle, 1864
 Eumorphocerus Thery, 1930
 Eupristocerus Deyrolle, 1864
 Eurynodes Thery, 1934
 Evimantius Deyrolle, 1864
 Falliellus Bellamy, 2001
 Franchetia Thery, 1946
 Geralius Harold, 1869
 Germarica Blackburn, 1887
 Gigantocoreabus Obenberger, 1942 - correct spelling is Gigantocoraebus, not -eabus
 Gracilocala Bellamy, 2006
 Habroloma Kerremans, 1900 - this genus is not one of Kerreman's, but was named and described by C.G. Thomson in 1864
 Helferia Obenberger, 1932
 Helferina Cobos, 1956
 Heromorphus Obenberger, 1916
 Holmerika Bellamy, 1988
 Holubia Obenberger, 1924
 Hylaeogena Obenberger, 1923
 Hypocisseis Thompson, 1879
 Indiadactylus Bellamy, 1992
 Ivalouwayneia Bellamy, 2006
 Jaroslavia Obenberger, 1942
 Kamosia Kerremans, 1898
 Kamosiella Bellamy, 1988
 Katangiella Bellamy, 1988
 Katonia Thery, 1941
 Kerremansella Obenberger, 1920 - This is the date of the description of the junior homonym Kerremansia Obenberger 1920. This replacement name was proposed in 1923, and so should be it Kerremansella Obenberger, 1923.
 Kerremansia Peringuey, 1908
 Lakhonia Descarpentries & Villiers, 1967 - This name is a primary junior homonym of Lakhonia Yang, 1936. The correct replacement name is Svataea Alonso-Zarazaga & Roca-Cusachs 2017.
 Leiopleura Deyrolle, 1864
 Lepidoclema Bellamy & Holm, 1985
 Lepismadora Velten, 1987
 Lius Deyrolle, 1864
 Lumawigia Bellamy, 2005
 Madaphlocteis Bellamy, 2006
 Madecorformica Bellamy, 2008
 Malagascoderes Bellamy, 2006
 Malawiella Bellamy, 1990
 Mandritsaria Obenberger, 1942
 Maroantsetra Obenberger, 1942 - This is not one of Obenberger's genera, but was named and described by Thery in 1937
 Maublancia Bellamy, 1998
 Melanocoraebus Baudon, 1968
 Meliacanthus Thery, 1942
 Melibaeopsis Kerremans, 1903
 Meliboeithon Obenberger, 1920
 Meliboeus Deyrolle, 1864
 Metasambus Kerremans, 1903
 Midongya Obenberger, 1942
 Mundaria Kerremans, 1894
 Mychommatus Murray, 1868
 Nalanda Thery, 1904
 Nastella Kerremans, 1903
 Neefia Bellamy, 2006 - the correct date is 2003
 Neefioides Bellamy, 2006 - the correct date is 2003
 Nelsonagrilus Jendek, 2006
 Neocoraebus Kerremans, 1903
 Neospades Blackburn, 1887
 Neotoxoscelus Fisher, 1921
 Neotrachys Obenberger, 1923
 Niehuisia Curletti, 1995
 Nickerleola Obenberger, 1923
 Obenbergerula Strand, 1932
 Omochyseus Waterhouse, 1887
 Pachycisseis Thery, 1929
 Pachyschelus Solier, 1833
 Paracephala Saunders, 1868
 Paracylindromorphus Thery, 1928
 Parademostis Obenberger, 1931
 Paradora Kerremans, 1900
 Paradorella Obenberger, 1923
 Paragrilus Saunders, 1871
 Parakamosia Obenberger, 1924
 Paranastella Obenberger, 1931
 Parasambus Descarpentries & Villiers, 1966
 Parastrigulia Bellamy, 1988
 Paraxenita Bellamy, 1988
 Pareumerus Deyrolle, 1864
 Peyrierasina Descarpentries, 1975
 Philippscelus Bellamy, 1998
 Philocoroebus Bellamy, 1991
 Phlocteis Kerremans, 1893
 Pilotrulleum Bellamy & Westcott, 1995
 Planidia Kerremans, 1899
 Polyonychus Chevrolat, 1838
 Promeliboeus Obenberger, 1924
 Pseudagrilodes Obenberger, 1923 - the correct date is 1921
 Pseudagrilus Laporte, 1835
 Pseudoclema Thery, 1938
 Pseudocoraebus Thery, 1905
 Pseudokamosia Thery, 1932
 Pseudokerremansia Bellamy & Holm, 1985
 Pseudophlocteis Bellamy, 1986
 Rhaeboscelis Chevrolat, 1838
 Sakalianus Jendek, 2007
 Sambirania Obenberger, 1942
 Sambomorpha Obenberger, 1924
 Sambus Deyrolle, 1864
 Seranambia Descarpentries, 1974
 Seyrigia Thery, 1937
 Shimogia Obenberger, 1942
 Sibuyanella Obenberger, 1942
 Sjoestedtius Thery, 1931
 Stanwatkinsius Barker & Bellamy, 2001
 Strandietta Bellamy, 1986
 Strigulia Kerremans, 1893
 Strigulioides Bellamy, 1986
 Suarezina Théry, 1936
 Synechocera Deyrolle, 1864
 Taphroceroides Hespenheide, 2008
 Taphrocerus Solier, 1833
 Therybupestris Strand, 1930 - correct spelling is Therybuprestis
 Tonkinula Obenberger, 1923
 Toxoscelus Deyrolle, 1864
 Trachys Fabricius, 1801
 Trypantius Waterhouse, 1887
 Vanroonia Obenberger, 1923
 Velutia Kerremans, 1900
 Wendleria Obenberger, 1924
 Xenita Thery, 1941
 Xenomerius Obenberger, 1924
 Zitella Bellamy, 1992

References

 
Polyphaga subfamilies